Damaged Justice was the fourth concert tour by the American heavy metal band Metallica. It began on September 11, 1988, and ended on October 8, 1989. The name is believed to be inspired either by the cover of its fourth studio album ...And Justice for All, or by the song "Damage, Inc." from the group's previous album, Master of Puppets. The single "One" was released during the tour.

Itinerary
The tour marked the first and, to date, only time that Metallica has played in the U.S. state of Delaware. On August 7, 1989, the band headlined a special and very drunken gig at Newark's Stone Balloon.

Recordings
The Damaged Justice tour was the first time the band had used live recordings of their concerts in single B-Sides and EP's (Those used on the Jump in the Fire single from 1984 were demos with faked audience noise dubbed over). The concert of February 5, 1989 was recorded and "For Whom the Bell Tolls", "Welcome Home (Sanitarium)", "Seek and Destroy" and "Creeping Death" were used as B-Sides for the "One" single in Europe and Japan, as well as the majority of the concert being re-released as part of Fan Can 4.

Both of the August 29 and 30, 1989, shows in Seattle were also recorded and "Harvester of Sorrow", "One", "Breadfan" and "Last Caress" were used for The Good, The Bad and The Live. The same mix of these shows used here was used on the digital re-masters of the band's first four albums when uploaded to digital retailers, though a different set of songs were used in this case, two from the respective album. In 1993, these concerts were re-mixed and released as video in the box set Live Shit: Binge & Purge.

In 2020, Metallica released a live concert video of the Irvine show.

First typical setlist
(Taken from the Madison, Wisconsin, Dane County Coliseum show on November 21, 1988)

 "Blackened" 
 "For Whom the Bell Tolls"
 "Welcome Home (Sanitarium)" 
 "Leper Messiah"
 "Harvester of Sorrow" 
 "Eye of the Beholder"
 Bass Solo
 "Master of Puppets"
 "One" 
 "Seek & Destroy" 
 "...And Justice for All" 
 "Creeping Death" 
 "Fade to Black" 
 Guitar Solo
 "Battery" 
 "Last Caress" (Originally performed by the Misfits)
 "Am I Evil?" (Originally performed by Diamond Head) 
 "Whiplash"

Second typical setlist
(Taken from the San Francisco Cow Palace show on December 10, 1988)

 "Blackened" 
 "For Whom the Bell Tolls"
 "Welcome Home (Sanitarium)" 
 "The Four Horsemen"
 "Harvester of Sorrow" 
 "Eye of the Beholder"
 Bass Solo
 "Master of Puppets"
 "One" 
 "Seek & Destroy" 
 "...And Justice for All" 
 "Creeping Death" 
 "Fade to Black" 
 Guitar Solo
 "Battery" 
 "Last Caress" (Originally performed by the Misfits)
 "Am I Evil?" (Originally performed by Diamond Head) 
 "Whiplash"
 "Breadfan" (Originally performed by Budgie)

Third typical setlist
(Taken from the Odessa, Texas, Ector County Coliseum show on January 18, 1989)

 "Blackened" 
 "For Whom the Bell Tolls"
 "Welcome Home (Sanitarium)" 
 "The Four Horsemen"
 "Harvester of Sorrow" 
 "Eye of the Beholder"
 Bass Solo
 "Master of Puppets"
 "One" 
 "Seek & Destroy" 
 "...And Justice for All" 
 "Creeping Death" 
 "Fade to Black" 
 Guitar Solo
 "Battery" 
 "Last Caress" (Originally performed by the Misfits)
 "Am I Evil?" (Originally performed by Diamond Head) 
 "Whiplash"

Fourth typical setlist
(Taken from the Seattle Center Coliseum show on August 29, 1989)

 "Blackened" 
 "For Whom the Bell Tolls"
 "Welcome Home (Sanitarium)" 
 "Harvester of Sorrow" 
 "The Four Horsemen" 
 "The Thing That Should Not Be" 
 Bass Solo
 "Master of Puppets" 
 "Fade to Black" 
 "Seek & Destroy" 
 "...And Justice for All" 
 "One" 
 "Creeping Death" 
 Guitar Solo
 "Battery" 
 "Last Caress" (Originally performed by the Misfits)
 "Am I Evil?" (Originally performed by Diamond Head) 
 "Whiplash" 
 "Breadfan" (Originally performed by Budgie)

Alternate songs
The setlist remained fairly consistent over the course of the tour. "Blackened" opened every performance with the exception of "Creeping Death" at some concerts in the summer of 1989. "The Wait" was teased as part of the second encore beginning with the spring '89 Pacific Rim tour. Other covers teased included "Prowler" (originally performed by Iron Maiden), "Helpless", "How Many More Times" by Led Zeppelin and "Black Night" by Deep Purple. "Eye of the Beholder" was often played as the fifth or sixth song, immediately following "Harvester of Sorrow"; it was switched out fairly regularly with "The Four Horsemen". "Leper Messiah" made infrequent appearances in this position as well. "Damage, Inc." followed the bass solo initially (this can be heard on various bootlegs from the fall '88 European tour) but was for the most part phased out by the end of the year and used as an encore when at all. The encores changed almost every night but almost always consisted of the covers "Breadfan" and "Blitzkrieg" (rare) among them as well as the aforementioned "Damage, Inc." and "Motorbreath", from Kill 'Em All. The band also started switching instruments during "Am I Evil?" at certain dates starting in 1989. Lars Ulrich would be on lead vocals, Jason Newsted on guitar, Kirk Hammett on bass and James Hetfield on drums. The group performed it at these shows: Nagoya, Japan, on May 18; Newark, Delaware, on August 7; Irvine, California, on September 23; and São Paulo on October 7.

Around halfway through the tour as the "One" single and video became more successful, it moved further down the setlist to the first encore, and "Fade to Black" would take its spot between "Master of Puppets" and "Seek & Destroy".

Tour dates

Personnel
 James Hetfield – lead vocals, rhythm guitar
 Kirk Hammett – lead guitar, backing vocals
 Lars Ulrich – drums
 Jason Newsted – bass, backing vocals

References

Metallica concert tours
1988 concert tours
1989 concert tours